Althea & Donna were a Jamaican reggae vocal duo, consisting of Althea Rose Forrest and Donna Marie Reid. They are best known for their 1977 single "Uptown Top Ranking", which was a number-one hit in the United Kingdom in 1978.

Career
The Jamaican teenage singers Althea Forrest and Donna Reid – then 17 and 18 years old respectively – caused a chart surprise when their reggae song "Uptown Top Ranking" became a no. 1 hit in the UK in February 1978. They released the album of the same name in 1978,  backed by The Revolutionaries, on the Virgin Records subsidiary Front Line, The album was produced by Karl Pitterson. The duo recorded several more singles with little success. In 2001, Caroline Records reissued the full-length Uptown Top Ranking.

Discography

Albums
 Uptown Top Ranking (1978), Virgin/Front Line

Singles
 "Uptown Top Ranking" (1977), Lightning/Joe Gibbs/Warners (1978), Virgin
 "Love One Another" (1978), Lightning/Joe Gibbs/Warners
 "Puppy Dog Song" (1978), Front Line
 "Going to Negril" (1978), Front Line
 "Top Rankin" (1995), Ice Town Music

See also
List of one-hit wonders on the UK Singles Chart
List of reggae musicians
List of performers on Top of the Pops
List of artists who reached number one on the UK Singles Chart
Caribbean music in the United Kingdom

References

Jamaican reggae musical groups
Jamaican musical duos
20th-century Jamaican women singers
Female musical duos
Girl groups
Reggae duos